Orthotylinae is a subfamily of plant bugs in the family Miridae. There are at least 650 described species and at least 70 genera in Orthotylinae. The Orthotylinae have traditionally been diagnosed by their possession of lamellate, apically divergent parempodia.

Tribes
BioLib includes:
 Austromirini Carvalho, 1976
 Austromiris Kirkaldy, 1902
 Dasymiris Poppius, 1911
 Fronsetta Cassis, 2008
 Kirkaldyella Poppius, 1921
 Lattinova Cassis, 2008
 Metopocoris Cassis, 2008
 Myrmecoridea Poppius, 1921
 Myrmecoroides Gross, 1963
 Porphyrodema Reuter, 1904
 Sinistropa Cassis, 2008
 Watarrkamiris Cassis, 2008
 Zanessa Kirkaldy, 1902
 Ceratocapsini Van Duzee, 1916
 Coridromiini Tatarnic & Cassis, 2012
 Coridromius Signoret, 1862
 Halticini A. Costa, 1853
 Nichomachini Schuh, 1974
 Laurinia Reuter, 1884
 Nichomachus (bug) Distant, 1904
 Pseudonichomachus Schuh, 1974
 Orthotylini Van Duzee, 1916
 unplaced genus Cafayatina Carvalho & Carpintero, 1986

See also
 List of Orthotylinae genera

References

 Thomas J. Henry, Richard C. Froeschner. (1988). Catalog of the Heteroptera, True Bugs of Canada and the Continental United States. Brill Academic Publishers.

Further reading

External links

 NCBI Taxonomy Browser, Orthotylinae

 
Miridae